Unemployment in Scotland measured by the Office of National Statistics show unemployment in Scotland at 155,000 (5.6%) as of August 2015.

Statistics

See also 
 Unemployment in the United Kingdom
 Unemployment in Spain
 Unemployment in Poland

References

External links 
 Official Labour Market Statistics

Scotland
Economy of Scotland